The 1871–72 Football Association Challenge Cup was the first staging of the Football Association Challenge Cup, usually known in the modern era as the FA Cup, the oldest association football competition in the world. Fifteen of the association's fifty member clubs entered the first competition, although three withdrew without playing a game. In the final, held at Kennington Oval in London on 16 March 1872, Wanderers beat the Royal Engineers by a single goal, scored by Morton Betts, who was playing under the pseudonym A. H. Chequer.

Background
The Football Association, the governing body of the sport in England, had been formed in 1863, but for the first eight years of its existence, its member clubs played only friendly matches against each other, with no prizes at stake. In 1871, however, Charles Alcock, the association's secretary, conceived the idea for a knock-out tournament open to all member clubs, with a trophy to be awarded to the winners. Alcock's inspiration came from his days at Harrow School, where the houses which comprised the school competed each year for the title of "Cock House".

Rules
The rules of the competition stipulated that each team should consist of eleven players, and that each match should last 90 minutes (at this time, the Laws of the Game did not specify these matters). They made no provision for extra time. When a match was drawn after 90 minutes, there would either be a replay, or both teams would be allowed to proceed to the next round; the choice between these alternatives was left to the organising committee's discretion in each case. Matches were officiated by two umpires, one provided by each team: following disputes over the laws in the earlier rounds of the competition, a neutral referee was added in the later rounds

At this time, changes in the laws of the game came into force immediately. Thus the laws of 1871 were used for most of the competition, but the laws of 1872, which introduced the corner kick and the free kick for handball, were used for the last two matches (the final and the semi-final replay between Royal Engineers and Crystal Palace).

Format
First Round: 14 teams (with Hampstead Heathens getting a bye) would play against a different team. The seven winners would advance. Hitchin, Crystal Palace, Queen's Park and Donington School all advanced because of either a draw or the match not being played

Second Round: The remaining 10 teams would play. The 5 winners would move on.

Third Round: 4 teams would play, Queen's Park would advance to the Semi-Final without even playing a single match

Semi-Final: With Crystal Palace and Royal Engineers drawing in the Third Round, they would both advance. The four teams all had to replay. The winners all advanced.

Final: The two remaining teams would play at the Kennington Oval. The winner would be crowned Champions.

Results
Fifty clubs were eligible to enter, but only twelve chose to do so: Barnes, Civil Service, Clapham Rovers, Crystal Palace, Hampstead Heathens, Harrow Chequers, Harrow School, Lausanne, Royal Engineers, Upton Park, Wanderers and Windsor Home Park. Before the first round took place, however, Harrow School, Lausanne and Windsor Home Park all withdrew, reducing the number of entrants to nine. Six other clubs agreed to enter, however, including the leading club in Scotland, Queen's Park.

Most of the original entrants are now defunct. Queen's Park continued to compete in the FA Cup until 1887, when the Scottish Football Association banned its member clubs from entering the English competition. They are still active in the lower divisions of the Scottish Professional Football League. Marlow and Maidenhead (now Maidenhead United) are still active, and each has only missed a single season in the history of the competition. A team from the Civil Service still exists, playing in Amateur Football Alliance competitions. The Crystal Palace team from 1871 to 1872 was thought to be a defunct former amateur club, but historians have found links to the Crystal Palace professional club which exists today, although this has still to be officially ratified. The team from Hitchin in the 1870s reformed to become the modern Hitchin Town in 1928.

The leading Scottish club Queen's Park entered the competition and managed to reach the semi-finals without having to play a match, due to a combination of an inability to agree venue, opponents withdrawing from the competition and byes. After holding Wanderers to a draw in the semi-final, however, they could not afford to return to London for a replay and were themselves forced to withdraw, giving their opponents a walkover into the final.

Calendar

First round
Although there were seven matches scheduled in the first round, only four took place. Wanderers and Royal Engineers both won their matches by walkover when their opponents withdrew from the competition, and as Queen's Park and Donington School were unable to agree on a mutually acceptable date for the game, they were both allowed to progress to the second round without playing. Due to there being an odd number of entrants, Hampstead Heathens were awarded a bye to the second round. Barnes beat a Civil Service team consisting of only eight players. The first goal in FA Cup competition was scored by Jarvis Kenrick of Clapham Rovers.

Queen's Park and Donington School were both permitted to advance to the second round because they could not agree on a venue.
Hitchin and Crystal Palace were both permitted to advance to the second round without a replay being played

Second round
In the second round Queen's Park and Donington School were again drawn together. This time the school club withdrew from the competition altogether, meaning that Queen's Park progressed to the quarter-final, still without having played a match. At Kennington Oval, The Royal Engineers easily beat a Hitchin team that could muster only eight players. The match between Barnes and Hampstead Heathens ended in a draw after bad light stopped play. The committee ordered a replay (the first in FA Cup history), with the Heathens emerging victorious, despite playing both matches away from home and with only ten players.

Replays

Third round
Due to there being an odd number of teams left in the competition, Queen's Park received a bye and thus reached the semi-finals without having played a match in the competition. The match between Wanderers and Crystal Palace finished in a draw; both teams were allowed through to the semi-finals. Royal Engineers completed the semi-final line-up after beating Hampstead Heathens. The Heathens never again entered the competition.

Wanderers and Crystal Palace were both permitted to advance to the semi-finals without a replay

Semi-finals
All matches from this stage of the competition onwards were played at Kennington Oval in London. Both semi-finals finished in goalless draws and thus went to replays. Queen's Park, however, could not afford to make the long trip from Glasgow a second time and thus withdrew from the competition, giving Wanderers a place in the final. Wanderers proposed thirty minutes of extra time to settle the match, but Queen's Park refused. Royal Engineers secured the second place in the final by defeating Crystal Palace at the second attempt.

Replays

Final

The final took place at Kennington Oval between Wanderers and Royal Engineers. The Engineers were leading exponents of the tactic of passing the ball, which at the time was known as the "Combination Game" and considered extremely innovative at a time when most teams relied solely on dribbling. Despite this, Wanderers dominated the game and won 1–0 with a goal from Morton Betts. For unclear reasons, Betts played in the final under the pseudonym "A.H. Chequer", derived from his membership of the Harrow Chequers club.

See also
FA Cup
FA Cup Final

References

External links
FA Cup History at The Football Association
1871–72 FA Cup at Rec.Sport.Soccer Statistics Foundation

1871-72
FA Cup
FA Cup
FA Cup